Karl Borner (6 September 1898 – 6 November 1973) was a Swiss sprinter. He competed in three events at the 1924 Summer Olympics. In the 200 metres, Borner finished in 3rd place out of 4 sprinters in Heat 4, failing to advance to the Quarterfinals.

References

External links
 

1898 births
1973 deaths
Athletes (track and field) at the 1924 Summer Olympics
Swiss male sprinters
Olympic athletes of Switzerland
Sportspeople from the canton of Solothurn